Champions is a 1997 American film, starring Louis Mandylor, Danny Trejo and Ken Shamrock. It was written and directed by Peter Gathings Bunche.

Plot
William Rockman, a former "Terminal Combat" champion, enters in a new tournament to Avenge his brother's death.

Cast
 Louis Mandylor as William Rockman
 Danny Trejo as Max Brito
 Ken Shamrock as The King
 Lee Reherman as Steele Manheim
 Bobbie Blackford as Sgt. Kimberly Pepatone

References

External links
 IMDB Page
 

1997 films
American action films
1990s English-language films
1990s American films